Miller is a town in Lawrence County, Missouri, United States.  As of the 2010 census, the city population was 699.

History
A post office called Miller has been in operation since 1891. The community has the name of T. A. Miller, a railroad contractor.

Geography
Miller is located at  (37.215885, -93.841499). Miller is located on State Highway 39, north of State Highway 96 (Old U.S. Route 66).

Demographics

2010 census
As of the census of 2010, there were 699 people, 290 households, and 173 families living in the city. The racial makeup of the city was 97.6% White, 0.3% African American, 0.3% Native American, 0.4% Asian, 0.9% from other races, and 0.6% from two or more races. Hispanic or Latino of any race were 2.9% of the population.

There were 290 households, of which 33.1% had children under the age of 18 living with them, 42.4% were married couples living together, 11.4% had a female householder with no husband present, 5.9% had a male householder with no wife present, and 40.3% were non-families. 33.8% of all households were made up of individuals, and 15.9% had someone living alone who was 65 years of age or older. The average household size was 2.41 and the average family size was 3.08.

The median age in the city was 36.6 years. 27.6% of residents were under the age of 18; 8.3% were between the ages of 18 and 24; 26.1% were from 25 to 44; 22.6% were from 45 to 64; and 15.5% were 65 years of age or older. The gender makeup of the city was 51.1% male and 48.9% female.

2000 census
As of the census of 2000, there were 754 people, 323 households, and 207 families living in the city. The population density was 995.8 people per square mile (383.1/km2). There were 378 housing units at an average density of 499.2 per square mile (192.0/km2). The racial makeup of the city was 98.01% White, 0.13% African American, 0.27% Native American, 0.13% from other races, and 1.46% from two or more races. Hispanic or Latino of any race were 0.93% of the population.

There were 323 households, out of which 31.0% had children under the age of 18 living with them, 47.1% were married couples living together, 11.1% had a female householder with no husband present, and 35.9% were non-families. 34.1% of all households were made up of individuals, and 14.9% had someone living alone who was 65 years of age or older. The average household size was 2.33 and the average family size was 2.98.

In the city the population was spread out, with 27.1% under the age of 18, 7.6% from 18 to 24, 27.2% from 25 to 44, 21.2% from 45 to 64, and 17.0% who were 65 years of age or older. The median age was 36 years. For every 100 females, there were 98.4 males. For every 100 females age 18 and over, there were 92.3 males.

The median income for a household in the city was $24,722, and the median income for a family was $32,222. Males had a median income of $26,000 versus $17,768 for females. The per capita income for the city was $12,680. About 17.0% of families and 20.2% of the population were below the poverty line, including 28.8% of those under age 18 and 15.9% of those age 65 or over.

Education
Miller R-II School District operates one elementary school and Miller High School.

Miller has a public library, a branch of the Barry-Lawrence Regional Library.

Notable people
 Bobby Berk, Queer Eye interior design expert
 Dennis Franchione, college football coach

References

External links

 Miller Public Schools
 Historic maps of Miller in the Sanborn Maps of Missouri Collection at the University of Missouri

Cities in Lawrence County, Missouri
Cities in Missouri